Kenneth Henry Jones (18 May 1930 – 2 August 2015) was a Welsh Buddhist activist, poet, and teacher. He was considered an important voice in socially engaged Buddhism.

Biography
Born in Wales, Jones spent much of his career in higher learning. As an anarchist, Jones had at different times been associated with Communist Party of Great Britain, the Labour Party (Victory for Socialism Group) and the UK Green Party.

As a proponent of socially engaged Buddhism, Jones was a founder of the UK Network of Socially Engaged Buddhists and was a member of the International Advisory Committee of the Buddhist Peace Fellowship. He also authored The New Social Face of Buddhism: A Call to Action considered  important book on socially engaged Buddhism.

Jones taught at the Western Chan Fellowship and was in the lineage of Sheng-yen. He won many prizes for his poetry.

He died in August 2015 after a long battle with prostate cancer.

Bibliography

References

External links
Buddhism & Social Engagement: an introduction
The Emotional Climate of Nondualistic Practice, by Ken Jones
Law suit against reality, by Ken Jones
"Many Bodies, One Mind": Movements in British Buddhism

1930 births
2015 deaths
Welsh Buddhists
British scholars of Buddhism